Livio Bendaña may refer to:

 Livio Bendaña (footballer, born 1935), Nicaraguan football striker and manager
 Livio Bendaña (footballer, born 1969), Nicaraguan football striker, and son of the footballer born 1935